The Unalaska Formation is a Miocene Era geologic formation on Amaknak Island and Unalaska Island, in the Aleutian Islands archipelago of southwestern Alaska.

It consists mainly of volcanic breccia, flows, tuff, and intercalated sedimentary rocks. It is exposed over about 70 percent of Unalaska Island.

It preserves fossils dating back to the Miocene era of the Neogene period.

See also

 List of fossiliferous stratigraphic units in Alaska
 Paleontology in Alaska

References

Miocene geology
Neogene Alaska
Amaknak Island
Unalaska Island
Miocene Series of North America
Neogene stratigraphic units of North America
Geologic formations of Alaska